Özalp is a district of Van Province of Turkey. In the local elections of March 2019 Yakup Almaç from the Peoples ' Democratic Party was elected mayor(HDP). Abdulkadir Çelik was appointed Kaymakam by president Recep Tayyip Erdoĝan in August 2019. However Almaç was dismissed in November 2019 and Çelik appointed as well as the trustee of the municipality of Özalp. Following his appointment as a trustee, he dismissed also 28 municipality workers.

References

Populated places in Van Province
Districts of Van Province
Kurdish settlements in Turkey